Marcus Gjøe Rosenkrantz (25 January 176211 May 1838) was a Norwegian Government Minister and Member of Parliament.

Biography

Marcus Gjøe Rosenkrantz was born at  Vigvoll, Tveit near Kristiansand, Norway. His father, Otto Christian Rosenkrantz (1727–1785), was a Danish career military officer in various Dano-Norwegian regiments who served as commander of  Vardøhus Fortress.

He attended the Royal Military mathematical school in Christiania (now Oslo) from 1776 to 1780. In 1781, a became student at the University of Copenhagen where he earned his law degree in 1784. He worked for several years as an assessor for Overhoffretten, the highest court in Norway and later the County Court in Christiania.

In 1786, he bought Lerbaek Hovedgard manor at Frederikshavn  with assets inherited from a distant relative, and moved there in 1790. 

In 1796 he married  Maren Juel, by which he became a sizable landowner. After the death of her husband, Peder Holter (1723–1786), Maren Juel owned and managed a number of  properties  including Losby in  Lørenskog as well as the estates Hafslund and  Borregaard in Sarpsborg  and the Ljan Estate (Ljansbruket)  which included Stubljan in Nordstrand and  Hvitebjørn in Oppegård. In time, they became one of the largest sawmill owners and timber exporters in the country.

Rosenkrantz was among those who met  at Eidsvold in 1814, to discuss the future of Norway in the aftermath of the  Treaty of Kiel. He became first minister of Norway during the period 1814–1815.  He was elected as a Member of the Storting representing  Smaalenenes Amt  (now Østfold) from 1818 to 1820 and from 1824 to 1827. During 1827–29, he represented Fredrikshald.

Honors
Order of the Dannebrog
Serafimerordenen    
 Nordstjärneorden

References

Related reading
Glenthoj, Rasmus; Morten Nordhagen Ottesen (2014) Experiences of War and Nationality in Denmark and Norway, 1807-1815  ( Palgrave Macmillan) 
Schulerud,  Mentz  (1974) Hafslund gods: Fra Otte Bildt til M. G. Rosenkrantz   (Oslo: Aschehoug) 

1762 births
1838 deaths
People from Kristiansand
University of Oslo alumni
18th-century Norwegian lawyers
Government ministers of Norway
19th-century Norwegian politicians
Members of the Storting
Order of the Dannebrog
Order of the Polar Star
Gøye family
Rosenkrantz family